Dere (formerly Fisandın, also called Dereköy)  is a village in the central district (Karaman) of Karaman Province, Turkey. It is situated to the south of Karaman and to the north of Gödet Dam reservoir. It is on the creek between Karaman and the dam and is named after the Turkish word for creek, Dere. The population of the village was 1040 as of 2011.

References

Villages in Karaman Central District